CobB is a bacterial protein that belongs to the sirtuin family, a broadly conserved family of NAD+-dependent protein deacetylases.

References 

Bacterial proteins